Ivana Dragomirova Taneva (born 2 June 2000) is a footballer who plays as a defender for Cypriot First Division club AC Omonia. Born in Bulgaria, she represents the Cyprus women's national team.

Career
Taneva has been capped for the Cyprus national team, appearing for the team during the UEFA Women's Euro 2021 qualifying cycle.

References

External links
 
 

2000 births
Living people
Bulgarian women's footballers
Women's association football defenders
Bulgarian emigrants to Cyprus
Naturalized citizens of Cyprus
Cypriot women's footballers
AC Omonia players
Cyprus women's international footballers
Cypriot people of Bulgarian descent